Jessica Rich is an American shoe designer and fashion expert who is known for creating women's shoes that incorporate PVC design elements as her signature style. Rich is also a host and former reality show personality. She is known for her appearances on VH1's Real Chance of Love. Patti LaBelle is Rich's great-aunt.

Early life
Jessica Rich was born and raised in Grand Rapids, Michigan. She is the daughter of Janice Denise and Eric Willis. She has four siblings. Her father was the early tour and road manager for Patti LaBelle, who is also Rich's great-aunt.

Career

Television/film
In 2008, Rich participated in VH1's reality series Real Chance of Love, a dating show featuring brothers Ahmad "Real" Givens and Kamal "Chance" Givens. She was known on the show as Rabbit because Real likened her to an African American Jessica Rabbit.

Rich has appeared as a fashion expert and host on Access Hollywood, KTLA Morning News, Hollyscoop and others.

Fashion and footwear design 
In 2015, Rich launched The Jessica Rich Collection, a clothing line favored by celebrities, musicians, reality television personalities, and performers. In late 2017, Jessica debuted Transparent by Jessica Rich, her first line of shoes. Her signature aesthetic, in all of her collections, is the use of polyvinyl chloride (PVC) components in her footwear design, a material that is appealing for its design versatility and ability to be worn with any color clothing. Rich most commonly sells styles with a heel height of 120mm and a gold heel or gold sole her shoes are manufactured and purchased wholesale.

Some of the footwear line's celebrity clientele include the Kardashian sisters, Bella Thorne, Ashanti, Blac Chyna, Kesha, La La Anthony, Vanessa Simmons, Sasha Banks, Tamar Braxton, Heidi Klum, Jelena Karleuša, Fantasia, Tami Roman, Halle Berry, Ally Brooke, and Cardi B. Jennifer Lopez wore Rich's first design, the Fancy Stiletto, to a 2018 VMA after party paired with a skintight blouse and leggings from the Versace Pre-Fall 2018 collection. Lopez also wore Rich's shoes to events promoting the 2019 film Hustlers.

The collection has been featured in Vogue, Footwear News, People, InStyle, Us Weekly, and E! News.

In 2019, Rich launched a collection of men's footwear focused on an androgynous aesthetic and featuring singer, songwriter, and producer Jon B. as the brand ambassador.

The collection is sold via the company website and in various boutiques throughout the world. The first Jessica Rich Collection brick-and-mortar location opened in 2018 on Melrose Avenue in Los Angeles located next to Fairfax High School.

In August 2019, Rich announced her collection would be available in select Macy's stores.

References

External links

The Jessica Rich Shoe Collection

1984 births
Living people
African-American fashion designers
People from Grand Rapids, Michigan
American women fashion designers
21st-century African-American people
20th-century African-American people